The Möbius function  is a multiplicative function in number theory introduced by the German mathematician August Ferdinand Möbius (also transliterated Moebius) in 1832. It is ubiquitous in elementary and analytic number theory and most often appears as part of its namesake the Möbius inversion formula. Following work of Gian-Carlo Rota in the 1960s, generalizations of the Möbius function were introduced into combinatorics, and are similarly denoted .

Definition
For any positive integer , define  as the sum of the primitive th roots of unity. It has values in  depending on the factorization of  into prime factors:

  if  is a square-free positive integer with an even number of prime factors.
  if  is a square-free positive integer with an odd number of prime factors.
  if  has a squared prime factor.

The Möbius function can alternatively be represented as

 

Values

The first 50 values of the function are plotted below:

Larger values can be checked in: 
 Wolframalpha
 the b-file of OEIS

Applications

Mathematical series 
The Dirichlet series that generates the Möbius function is the (multiplicative) inverse of the Riemann zeta function; if  is a complex number with real part larger than 1 we have

This may be seen from its Euler product

Also:

 

 

  where  - Euler's constant.

The Lambert series for the Möbius function is:

For prime , we also have

Algebraic number theory 

Physics
The Möbius function also arises in the primon gas or free Riemann gas model of supersymmetry. In this theory, the fundamental particles or "primons" have energies . This follows from the fact that the factorization of the natural numbers into primes is unique.

In the free Riemann gas, any natural number can occur, if the primons are taken as bosons. If they are taken as fermions, then the Pauli exclusion principle excludes squares. The operator  that distinguishes fermions and bosons is then none other than the Möbius function .

The free Riemann gas has a number of other interesting connections to number theory, including the fact that the partition function is the Riemann zeta function. This idea underlies Alain Connes's attempted proof of the Riemann hypothesis.

Properties 

The equality above leads to the important Möbius inversion formula and is the main reason why  is of relevance in the theory of multiplicative and arithmetic functions.

There is a formula for calculating the Möbius function without directly knowing the factorization of its argument:

i.e.  is the sum of the primitive -th roots of unity. (However, the computational complexity of this definition is at least the same as that of the Euler product definition.)

Other identities satisfied by the Möbius function include

and

.

The first of these is a classical result while the second was published in 2020. Similar identities hold for the Mertens function.

Proof of the formula for  
Using

the formula

However it is also possible to prove this identity from first principles. First note that it is trivially true when . Suppose then that . The asserted result follows from the fact that every non-empty finite set has an equal number of odd- and even-cardinality subsets.

This last fact can be shown easily by induction on the cardinality  of a non-empty finite set . There is an obvious bijection between these two subclasses, pairing those subsets that have the same complement relative to the subset . Also, one of these two subclasses consists of all the subsets of the set , and therefore, by the induction hypothesis, has an equal number of odd- and even-cardinality subsets. The inductive step follows directly from these two bijections.

A related result is that the binomial coefficients exhibit alternating entries of odd and even power which sum symmetrically.

Average order
The mean value (in the sense of average orders) of the Möbius function is zero. This statement is, in fact, equivalent to the prime number theorem.

sections
 if and only if  is divisible by the square of a prime. The first numbers with this property are

4, 8, 9, 12, 16, 18, 20, 24, 25, 27, 28, 32, 36, 40, 44, 45, 48, 49, 50, 52, 54, 56, 60, 63, ... .

If  is prime, then , but the converse is not true. The first such numbers with three distinct prime factors (sphenic numbers) are

30, 42, 66, 70, 78, 102, 105, 110, 114, 130, 138, 154, 165, 170, 174, 182, 186, 190, 195, 222, ... .

and the first such numbers with 5 distinct prime factors are

2310, 2730, 3570, 3990, 4290, 4830, 5610, 6006, 6090, 6270, 6510, 6630, 7410, 7590, 7770, 7854, 8610, 8778, 8970, 9030, 9282, 9570, 9690, ... .

Mertens function 
In number theory another arithmetic function closely related to the Möbius function is the Mertens function, defined by

for every natural number . This function is closely linked with the positions of zeroes of the Riemann zeta function.

From the formula

it follows that the Mertens function is given by:

where  is the Farey sequence of order .

This formula is used in the proof of the Franel–Landau theorem.

Generalizations

Incidence algebras
In combinatorics, every locally finite partially ordered set (poset) is assigned an incidence algebra. One distinguished member of this algebra is that poset's "Möbius function". The classical Möbius function treated in this article is essentially equal to the Möbius function of the set of all positive integers partially ordered by divisibility. See the article on incidence algebras for the precise definition and several examples of these general Möbius functions.

Popovici's function
Constantin Popovici defined a generalised Möbius function  to be the -fold Dirichlet convolution of the Möbius function with itself. It is thus again a multiplicative function with

where the binomial coefficient is taken to be zero if .

Implementations
 WOLFRAM MATHEMATICA has function MoebiusMu
 Maxima CAS has function moebius (n)
 geeksforgeeks has C++, Python3, Java, C#, PHP, Javascript implementations
 Rosetta Code
 Sage Moebius function

See also

 Liouville function
 Mertens function
 Ramanujan's sum
 Sphenic number

Notes

Citations

Sources

External links
 

Multiplicative functions